Statistics of Lao League for the 2005 season.

Overview
It was contested by 11 teams, and Vientiane FC won the championship.

League standings

Relegation playoff
Vilakone FC and Kavin College FC were automatically promoted from Lao League 2. A play off was held between the third place team and the third bottom team in the top division.

References

Lao Premier League seasons
1
Laos
Laos